Eric Alberto-Lopez (born June 28, 1990), known professionally as Ape Drums, is a Mexican-American DJ and record producer. Ape Drums is known for fusing electronic dance music with Caribbean sounds, described by Thump as "Modern Dancehall Music." He is also one third of the DJ/production trio Major Lazer, replacing Jillionaire in the summer of 2019.

Career 
His debut single "Bashment" was released in 2014 on Slow Roast Records. His Major Lazer collaboration, "The Way We Do This" (a reimagining of the classic "Bookshelf Riddim") was played at festivals worldwide by the group, before it was finally released in 2016 on Ape Drums' debut Mad Decent EP. Later in 2016, Ape Drums released "LFUTP" featuring up-and-coming Philly artist Lil Uzi Vert via Fools Gold Records.

Ape Drums gained a new level of international fame when his single "Mutant Brain" was used in the 2016 Kenzo World ad campaign, directed by Spike Jonze and starring actress Margaret Qualley. The single was then quickly signed and released by Interscope Records.

On June 1, 2019, at the Governors Ball Music Festival, it was officially announced that Ape Drums would replace Jillionaire as the new member of Major Lazer. The trio now consists of founding member Diplo, Walshy Fire and Ape Drums.

Singles

As artist

As feature artist

Remixes

References

American electronic musicians
American DJs
Record producers from Texas
Mad Decent artists
Major Lazer members
Electronic dance music DJs
1990 births
Living people